Guatteria is a genus of flowering plants in the family Annonaceae. It is the largest genus in the family in South America, and the dominant genus in mature forest. The fruits are berries, borne in clusters on short stalks.

Species include:

 Guatteria anomala R.E. Fries
 Guatteria atabapensis Aristeg.
 Guatteria augusti Diels
 Guatteria boliviana H.J.P.Winkl.
 Guatteria calliantha R.E.Fr.
 Guatteria chiriquiensis R.E.Fr.
 Guatteria dura R.E.Fr.
 Guatteria ecuadorensis R.E.Fr.
 Guatteria eriopoda DC.
 Guatteria excelsa Poepp. ex Mart.
 Guatteria ferruginea A. St. Hil.
 Guatteria fruticosa R.E.Fr.
 Guatteria geminiflora R.E.Fr.
 Guatteria glauca Ruiz & Pav.
 Guatteria guentheri Diels
 Guatteria insignis R.E. Fries
 Guatteria jefensis Barringer
 Guatteria juninensis R.E.Fr.
 Guatteria knoopiana Pittier
 Guatteria liesneri D.M. Johnson & N.A. Murray
 Guatteria microcarpa Ruiz & Pav. ex G. Don
 Guatteria modesta Diels
 Guatteria occidentalis R.E.Fr.
 Guatteria panamensis R.E. Fries
 Guatteria pastazae R.E.Fr.
 Guatteria pogonopus Martius
 Guatteria ramiflora (D.R.Simpson) Erkens & Maas
 Guatteria recurvisepala R.E.Fr.
 Guatteria sodiroi Diels
 Guatteria stenopetala R.E.Fr.
 Guatteria tonduzii Diels
 Guatteria williamsii R.E.Fr.

References

 
Annonaceae genera
Flora of South America
Trees of South America
Taxonomy articles created by Polbot
Taxa named by José Antonio Pavón Jiménez